Francisco Morales may refer to:

Francisco Morales (baseball), Venezuelan baseball pitcher
Francisco Morales Bermúdez, Peruvian politician and general
Francisco Morales Lomas, Spanish poet
Francisco Morales Vivas, Argentinian judoka